The Hungarian Water Polo Federation (MVLSZ) is the governing body of water polo in Hungary. It was founded in 1989, and is the successor to the Magyar Úszó Szövetség, with the swimmers.

The Hungarian Water Polo Federation is a member of the Ligue Européenne de Natation (LEN) and the Fédération Internationale de Natation (FINA). Its headquarters are in Budapest.

Hosted tournaments
World Championships
2017 World Aquatics Championships – Budapest, July 14–30
2022 World Aquatics Championships – Budapest, June 18 – July 3

European Championships
1926 Men's European Water Polo Championship – Budapest, August 18–22
1958 Men's European Water Polo Championship – Budapest, August 31 – September 6
2001 Men's European Water Polo Championship / 2001 Women's European Water Polo Championship – Budapest, July 15–24
2014 Men's European Water Polo Championship / 2014 Women's European Water Polo Championship – Budapest, July 14–27
2020 Men's European Water Polo Championship / 2020 Women's European Water Polo Championship – Budapest, January 12–26

Honours
Men's
 Olympic Games:  Winner (9 times - 1932, 1936, 1952, 1956, 1964, 1976, 2000, 2004, 2008);  Runner-up (3 times - 1928, 1948, 1972);  Third place (3 times - 1960, 1968, 1980)
 World Championship:  Winner (3 times - 1973, 2003, 2013);  Runner-up (6 times - 1975, 1978, 1982, 1998, 2005, 2007);  Third place (1 time - 1991)
 European Championship:  Winner (13 times - 1926, 1927, 1931, 1934, 1938, 1954, 1958, 1962, 1974, 1977, 1997, 1999, 2020);  Runner-up (6 times - 1970, 1983, 1993, 1995, 2006, 2014);  Third place (6 times - 1981, 2001, 2003, 2008, 2012, 2016)
 FINA World League:  Gold medal - 2003, 2004;  Silver medal - 2005, 2007, 2013, 2014;  Bronze medal - 2002
 FINA World Cup:  Gold medal - 1979, 1995, 1999;  Silver medal - 1993, 1995, 2002, 2006;  Bronze medal - 1989, 1997
Universiade:  Gold medal - 1963, 1965, 2003, 2013, 2015;  Silver medal - 1959, 1977, 1993, 1995, 1997, 2005;  Bronze medal - 1961, 1970, 1999, 2001, 2007

Women's
 World Championship:  Winner (2 times - 1994, 2005);  Runner-up (1 time - 2001);  Third place (1 time - 2013)
 European Championship:  Winner (3 times - 1991, 2001, 2016);  Runner-up (5 times - 1985, 1987, 1989, 1995, 2003);  Third place (6 times - 1993, 2006, 2008, 2012, 2014, 2020)
 FINA World League:  Silver medal - 2004
 FINA World Cup:  Gold medal - 2002;  Silver medal - 1988;  Bronze medal - 1989, 1993, 1995
Universiade:  Silver medal - 2009, 2013

Divisions

Men's
Hungary men's national water polo team
Hungary men's national junior water polo team
Hungary men's national youth water polo team

Women's
Hungary women's national water polo team
Hungary women's junior national water polo team
Hungary women's youth national water polo team

Current head coaches

Competitions 
Magyar Vízilabda Szövetség is responsible for organising the following competitions:

Men's water polo
Országos Bajnokság I (Tier 1)
Országos Bajnokság I/B (Tier 2) – two sections
Országos Bajnokság II (Tier 3) – four sections (South-East, North-East, Central, West)

Women's water polo
Országos Bajnokság I (women) (Tier 1)
Országos Bajnokság I/B (women) (Tier 2)

Cups
Magyar Kupa – Men
Magyar Kupa (women) – Women

Presidents
 Dénes Kemény (2012–2018)
 Attila Vári (2018– )

Current sponsorships
e·on - Official main sponsor
Volvo - Official sponsor
Vodafone - Official sponsor
Huawei - Official sponsor
Soproni - Official sponsor
Univer - Official sponsor
Unicum - Official sponsor
Diapolo - Official sponsor
M4 Sport - Official sponsor
Volánbusz - Official sponsor
BENU - Official sponsor
OMV - Official sponsor
Marriott Budapest - Official sponsor

See also
Hungarian water polo league system

External links 
Magyar Vízilabda Szövetség (official website)

Water polo in Hungary
Hungary
Water polo
1989 establishments in Hungary
Sports organizations established in 1989